Secrets of Three Hungry Wives is a 1978 American television thriller film directed by Gordon Hessler, and starring Jessica Walter, Gretchen Corbett, Eve Plumb, and Heather MacRae. It was one of the later scripts written by Jo Heims prior to her death from breast cancer. Alan Surgal finished the script.

Plot
Three married women become suspects when a man they all had an affair with is murdered.

Cast
Jessica Walter as Christina Wood
Gretchen Corbett as Karen McClure
Eve Plumb as Vicki Wood
Heather MacRae as Lynn Briskin
James Franciscus as Mark Powers
Craig Stevens as Bill McClure
Raymond St. Jacques as Detective Inspector George Dunbar

Reception
Kevin Thomas of the Los Angeles Times said the film "offers compassionate comment, not social criticism, along with its supense."

References

External links

1978 television films
1978 films
Films directed by Gordon Hessler
American crime films
American thriller television films
Films with screenplays by Jo Heims
NBC network original films
1970s English-language films
1970s American films